Araxá Esporte Clube, commonly referred to as Araxá, is a currently inactive Brazilian football club based in Araxá, Minas Gerais. It last played in the Campeonato Mineiro Segunda Divisão, the third tier of the Minas Gerais state football league. Founded in 1958, the club played only once at the nacional level, finishing the 2013 Campeonato Brasileiro Série D in the 38th position.

History
The club was founded on 20 September 1958. Araxá won the Campeonato Mineiro Módulo II in 1966, 1978, 1990 and in 2012, and the Campeonato Mineiro Segunda Divisão in 2007 and in 2011.

Achievements

 Campeonato Mineiro Módulo II:
 Winners (4): 1966, 1978, 1990, 2012
 Campeonato Mineiro Segunda Divisão:
 Winners (2): 2007, 2011

Stadium
Araxá Esporte Clube play their home games at Estádio Municipal Fausto Alvim. The stadium has a maximum capacity of 4,500 people.

References

External links
 
  (archived)

 
Association football clubs established in 1958
Football clubs in Minas Gerais
1958 establishments in Brazil